Wojciech Zamecznik (13 January 1923 in Warsaw – 12 May 1967 in Warsaw) was a Polish graphic artist, architect, photographer and interior designer.

Zamecznik's most notable works are movie and socio-political posters. He created his own, ascetic poster style which was derived from traditional forms of constructivism and Bauhaus. He was also an author of book graphics and magazine designs. He designed also some remarkable record covers for the label Polskie  Nagrania Muza 

He was the cousin of Stanisław Zamecznik, graphic artist, poster artist, scenographer and architect.

Bibliography
 Wojciech Zamecznik. Photo-graphics, edited by Karolina Puchala-Rojek and Karolina Ziebinska-Lewandowska, Fundacja Archeologia Fotografii, Warsaw 2015
 Wojciech Zamecznik. Photography in all its forms, edited by Anne Lacoste, Collection Musée de l’Elysée n°3, Lausanne, Editions Noir sur Blanc, 2016
 Wojciech Zamecznik NOW!, edited by Karolina Lewandowska, text by Karol Sienkiewicz, Fundacja Archeologia Fotografii, Warsaw 2012
 Wojciech Zamecznik 1923-1967, edited by Janina Fijalkowska, National Museum in Warsaw, Warsaw 1968

Footnotes

References
 Website dedicated to Wojciech Zamecznik Archeology of Photography Foundation

External links
 
 

1923 births
1967 deaths
Film poster artists
Polish graphic designers
Polish interior designers
Photographers from Warsaw
Polish poster artists
20th-century Polish architects